"All 'Bout the Money" (sometimes spelled as "All About the Money") is a song written by Swedish singer and songwriter Meja with Douglas Carr, and released as a single from Meja's second studio album, Seven Sisters (1998).  Lyrically it is about society's dependence on money. The single scored chart success in many countries, peaking within the top 10 in Denmark, Greece, Japan, the Netherlands, Norway, and Sweden. In the United Kingdom, "All 'Bout the Money" reached number 12, while in the US, it hit number 36 on the Billboard Hot Dance Club Play chart and number 37 on the Billboard Mainstream Top 40 chart.

Critical reception
Chuck Taylor from Billboard described the song as an "acoustic guitar-based pop tune that's at once intelligent, clever, and hooky enough to turn ships back to shore." He noted further that "this is mature pop from a budding artist who has plenty to say" and "it's got "hit" emblazoned on every note." In 2012, Porcys listed the song at number 14 in their ranking of "100 Singles 1990-1999".

Charts

Weekly charts

Year-end charts

Certifications

Release history

References

 

1998 songs
1998 singles
Columbia Records singles
English-language Swedish songs
Meja songs